The Hartford Dark Blues were formed by Morgan Bulkeley and joined the National Association of Professional Base Ball Players for the 1874 season. They finished in seventh place in their debut.

Regular season

Season standings

Record vs. opponents

Roster

Player stats

Batting 
Note: G = Games played; AB = At bats; H = Hits; Avg. = Batting average; HR = Home runs; RBI = Runs batted in

Starting pitchers
Note: G = Games pitched; IP = Innings pitched; W = Wins; L = Losses; ERA = Earned run average; SO = Strikeouts

References

1874 Hartford Dark Blues season at Baseball Reference

Hartford Dark Blues seasons
1874 in baseball
Hartford Dark Blues